The Western Allied Campaign in Romania consisted of war declarations and aerial operations during the Second World War by 8 Western Allied countries against Romania which itself was primarily engaged on the Eastern Front in fighting against the Soviet Union.

War declarations 
Romania declared war on the British Empire on 6 December 1941 and on the United States on 12 December. The British returned the war declaration that December, however the Americans only did so in the summer of 1942. Two American allies, Nicaragua and Haiti, declared war on Romania on 19 and 24 December respectively. Romania promptly returned these declarations. Four British allies also declared war on Romania: Canada (7 December), New Zealand (7 December), Australia (8 December), and South Africa (9 December). However, Romania never returned these declarations (likely because the four countries were seen as British subjects by the Romanian leadership).

Aerial operations
Having declared war on Romania on 5 June 1942, the first attack on Romanian territory was conducted by the United States Army Air Forces on 12 June. Ten B-24 Liberators attacked the Romanian oil refineries at Ploiești, two attacked unidentified targets and one attacked the port of Constanța. The damage inflicted was negligible and none of the 13 aircraft were lost. 

The second American attack took place over a year later, on 1 August 1943. Code-named Operation Tidal Wave, it consisted of a large-scale air raid over Romanian oil refineries at Ploiești by 178 unescorted B-24 Liberators. Over 50 of the American bombers were shot down by the German and Romanians during the raid, with the Royal Romanian Air Force claiming 20 American aircraft while losing only 2 fighters.  

After the two previous isolated attacks, an organized bombing campaign was carried out against Romania between 4 April and 19 August 1944. The American aircraft were joined by the United Kingdom's Royal Air Force. The campaign was called off on 19 August 1944. It ultimately proved to be an unsuccessful endeavour, as the Allies failed to fulfill their objective of knocking out Ploiești's oil production. In just over a year, from Operation Tidal Wave until the 1944 bombing campaign was called off, the Royal Romanian Air Force, aided by Romanian artillery, shot down 259 Allied aircraft (223 bombers and 36 fighters). Allied Nazi German forces shot down 66 more Allied aircraft. In total, Allied casualties amounted to 1,706 KIA and 1,123 POWs. Romanian aircraft losses were much lower, amounting to 80 fighters shot down. It is not known how many Romanian aircrew were killed, but one of them was Alexandru Șerbănescu, Romania's second best flying ace (47 kills, shot down on 18 August). In addition, 7,693 Romanian civilians were killed, 2,673 of them on 4 April, when the campaign was kickstarted by the American bombing of Bucharest.

Ground operations
Although not directly engaging Romanian ground troops, the Western Allies had supplied military equipment to the Red Army via Lend-Lease. The Romanians had captured some Western tanks which had been leased to the Soviets: four M3 Lees, five M3 Stuarts, four Valentine Mk IIIs and nineteen unspecified Vickers tanks.

References 

World War II aerial operations and battles of the Eastern Front
Aerial operations and battles of World War II
Aerial operations and battles of World War II involving Germany
Aerial operations and battles of World War II involving the United States
Battles and operations of World War II involving Romania
Military history of Romania during World War II
Oil campaign of World War II
Ploiești
Romania–United States military relations
Germany–United States military relations